The Carlos Palanca Memorial Awards for Literature winners in the year 2000 (rank, title of winning entry, name of author):

English division
Poetry
 First prize: "Tabon and Other Poems" by Edgar Maranan
 Second prize: "Afterhours, Afterlives" by Ramil Digal Gulle
 Third prize: "The Memory of Skin" by Raymund Magno Garlitos

Short story
 First prize: "The Woman in the Box" by Jose Dalisay, Jr.
 Second prize: "Dance" by Isolde Anmate
 Third prize: "Drive" by Faye Ilogon

Short story for children
 First prize: "Fish for Two" by Victoria Estrella C. Bravo
 Second prize: "The Hare Tells His Story" by Mary Agnes Dizon
 Third prize: "The Night Monkeys" by Lakambini Sitoy

Essay
 First prize: "Many Mansions" by Alexis Abola
 Second prize: "The Way She Was: Memories of Lola Posta's Hundred Years" by Edgar Maranan
 Third prize: "The Ghost of Bebop on Bignay Street" by Lourd Ernest de Vera

Full Length Play
 First prize: No winner
 Second prize: No winner
 Third prize: "In the Matter of Willie Grayson" by Reme Grefalda

One-act play
 First prize: No winner
 Second prize: "The Tuesday Club" by Lady Michelle Sering
 Third prize: "Ghosts Don't Do That or Do They?" by Elma Famador

Future Fiction
 First prize: "Subterrania" by Luis Joaquin Katigbak
 Second prize: "Secret Notes on the Dead Stars" by Lakambini Sitoy
 Third prize: "The Field" by Adel Gabot

Filipino division
Tula
 First prize: "Ang Maisisilid sa Pandama" by Eugene Evasco
 Second prize: "Ang Pasipiko sa Loob ng Aking Maleta" by Alwynn C. Javier
 Third prize: "Batubalani at Iba pang mga Tula" by Rebecca T. Añonuevo

Maikling Kuwento
 First prize: "Alyas Juan de La Cruz" by Placido Parcero, Jr.
 Second prize: "Kung Paano Ko Inayos ang Buhok Ko Matapos ang Mahaba-haba Ring Paglalakbay" by Norman Wilwayco
 Third prize: "Logos sa Lotus" by Fr. Arnel Vitor, CM

Maikling Kuwentong Pambata
 First prize: "Hilong Talilong" by Eugene Evasco
 Second prize: "May Mga Lihim Kami ni Ingkong" by Luis Gatmaitan
 Third prize:  "Kung Bakit Espesyal si Tatay" by Eleanor Yu

Sanaysay
 First prize: "Ang Resureksyon" by Roberto T. Añonuevo
 Second prize: "Talinhaga ng Gana" by Rebecca T. Añonuevo
 Third prize: "Kilometro Zero ni Isang Lagalag na Taong-bahay" by Eugene Evasco

Full-length play in Filipino
 First prize: No winner
 Second prize: "Luto, Linis Laba" by Alfred A. Yuson
 Third prize: "Me Esep o Wala, Sa Pera'y Lahat Namangha" by Dominic D. Manrique

One-act play in Filipino
 First prize: "Linggo ng Palaspas" by George de Jesus III
 Second prize: "Kabsat" by Reynaldo A. Duque
 Third prize: "Anino" by Allan Lopez

Teleplay
 First prize: "Selyo at Kastilyo" by Aurora Yumul
 Second prize: "Gintong Ilawan" by Lazaro P. Torres Jr.
 Third prize: "Ang May Bahay" by Leah C. Eriguel

Screenplay
 First prize: "Gabi ng Tinggiirin" by Floy Quintos
 Second prize: "Sirena" by Jose Dennis C. Teodosio
 Third prize: "Ang Bata sa Daan-Pari" by Joel V. Almazan

Future Fiction
 First prize: "Kalinangan" by Johannes Chua
 Second prize: "Cell Phone" by George de Jesus III
 Third prize: "Desaparecidos" by Alwin Aguirre

Iloko Short story
 First prize: "Tupa: Ladawan ni Pangalatok Idi Daan a Milenio" by Jaime M. Agpalo Jr.
 Second prize: "Uy-ayam Ti Gubat" by Maria L.M. Fres-Felix
 Third prize: "Apo Lakay" by Reynaldo A. Duque

Cebuano Short story

Hiligaynon Short story
 First prize: Aswang by Isabel D. Sebullen
 Second prize: "Baha" by Nerio E. Jedeliz Jr.
 Third Prize

Kabataan essay
English
 First prize: "The Hero in My Blood" by Enrico Miguel Subido
 Second prize: "The Pinoy Also Rises" by Douglas James L. Candano
 Third prize: "Neither Rizal, nor Bonifacio" by Mark Adrian C. Ramirez

Filipino
 First prize: "Yaya" by Aleksandre Pates
 Second prize: "Kumander Panas: Bayaning Filipino ng Bagong Milenyo" by Ranjith M. Mendoza
 Third prize: "Maestra Monica: Bagong Bayaning Angat sa Iba" by Rose Ativo Jabeguero

References
 

2000
Palanca